Benjamin (Ben) Morley (born 10 March 1994) is a British speedway rider.

Career
Morley rode for Isle of Wight Warriors in the National League for the second successive season in 2019. He also joined Eastbourne Eagles on 22 December 2018, with the Eagles moving up to the SGB Championship in 2019.

In 2021, he rode for the Kent Kings in the SGB Championship 2021. The following season in 2022, he rode for the Birmingham Brummies in the SGB Championship 2022. However, he later signed for Plymouth Gladiators on an interim basis.

In 2023, he signed for Kent Royals for the 2023 National Development League speedway season.

References 

1994 births
Living people
British speedway riders
Birmingham Brummies riders
Eastbourne Eagles riders
Hackney Hawks riders
Isle of Wight Islanders riders
Kent Kings riders
Lakeside Hammers riders
Plymouth Gladiators speedway riders
Rye House Cobras riders
Rye House Rockets riders
Redcar Bears riders